Guido Crepas (15 July 1933, in Milan – 31 July 2003, in Milan), better known by his pen name Guido Crepax, was an Italian comics artist. He is most famous for his character Valentina, created in 1965 and very representative of the spirit of the 1960s. The Valentina series of books and strips became noted for Crepax's sophisticated drawing, and for the psychedelic, dreamlike storylines, generally involving a strong dose of erotism. His work was often politically motivated too, inspired by his Communist convictions. A film based on his work called Baba Yaga, featuring the character Valentina, was made in 1973.

Works

Valentina stories

 The Lesmo Curve (1965)
 The Subterraneans (1965)
 The Descent (1966)
 Un Poco Loco (1966)
 Ciao, Valentina (1966)
 The Force of Gravity (1967)
 Funny Valentine (1967)
 Valentina in Sovietland (1968)
 Valentina in Boots (1968)
 Marianna in the Country (1968)
 Fearless Paper Doll Valentina (1968)
 Filippo and Valentina (1969)
 Valentina's Baby (1969)
 The Manuscript Found in a Stroller (1970)
 Baba Yaga (1971)
 Bluebeard (1971)
 Who's Afraid of Baba Yaga? (1971)
 Valentina the Fearless (1971)
 Annette (1972)
 The Little King (1972)
 Pietro Giacomo Rogeri (1972)
 The Time Eater (1973)
 Fallen Angels (1973)
 The Empress's New Clothes (1973)
 Reflection (1974)
 Private Life (1975)
 Subconscious Valentina (1976)
 Valentina the Pirate (1976)
 Rembrandt and the Witches (1977)
 Anthropology (1977)
 Le Zattere, Venice (1980)

Other heroines
 La casa matta (feat. Bianca, 1969), Edip
 Anita, una storia possibile (1972), Persona/Ennio Ciscato Editore
 Histoire d'O (1975), Franco Maria Ricci Editore, from the novel by Pauline Réage
 Emmanuelle (1978), Olympia Press, from the novel by Emmanuelle Arsan
 Justine (1979), Olympia Press, from the novel La nouvelle Justine by de Sade
 Hello, Anita! (1980), L'isola trovata, in colour
 Belinda 1 & 2 (1983), Editori del Grifo
 I viaggi di Bianca (1984), Milano Libri, inspired by Jonathan Swift's Gulliver's Travels
 Venere in pelliccia (1984), Olympia Press, inspired to a tale by Leopold von Sacher-Masoch.
 Bianca 2. Odesseda (1987), Editori del Grifo
 Emmanuelle l'antivergine (1990), Rizzoli
 Eroine alla fine: Salomé (2000), Lizard Edizioni
 Crepax 60|70 (feat. Belinda, and Valentina 2003), Fiction inc. Tokyo

Other works
 L'astronave pirata (1968), Rizzoli
 Il dottor Jekill (1972), Persona/Ennio Ciscato Editore
 Circuito interno (1977), Edizioni Tempo Medico
 Casanova (1977), Franco Maria Ricci Editore
 L'uomo di Pskov (1977), CEPIM (Sergio Bonelli Editore), in colour
 L'uomo di Harlem (1979), CEPIM (Sergio Bonelli Editore)
 La calata di Macsimiliano XXXVI (1984), Editori del Grifo
 Conte Dracula (1987), Rizzoli-Milano Libri, from the novel Dracula by Bram Stoker
 Dr.Jekyll e Mr.Hide (1987), Rizzoli-Milano Libri, from the novel by Robert Louis Stevenson
 Giro di vite (1989), Olympia Press, from the novel The Turn of the Screw by Henry James
 Nessuno (1990), Milano Libri
 Le clinicommedie (1990), Editiemme
 Il processo di Franz Kafka (1999), Piemme, from the novel The Trial by Franz Kafka
 Justine and The Story of O (2000), graphic novel of the works by Marquis de Sade and Anne Desclos respectively
 Frankenstein (2002), Grifo Edizioni, from the novel by Mary Shelley

Wargames
Besides his much better known activity as a graphic artist, Crepax was a keen wargamer and wargame designer and collector of paper soldiers, drawn by himself.
He was the author of some of the first wargames published in Italy to be widely circulated:
 La Battaglia di Trafalgar (Corriere dei Piccoli, 1964)
 La Battaglia di Waterloo (Linus, 1965)
 La Battaglia di Pavia (Linus, 1967)
 La Battaglia del Lago Ghiacciato - Alexandr Nevsky (Linus 1972, poi ristampato da Milano Libri)

Other activities

He was also active as an animator and as an album cover designer.

See also 
 Fernando Carcupino 
 Hugo Pratt
 Dino Battaglia 
 Damiano Damiani
 Milo Manara
 Italian comics

Notes

References
 Crepax publications – Fondazione Fossati 
 Guido Crepax albums – Bedetheque

External links
 Guido Crepax biography on Lambiek Comiclopedia
 Guido Crepax biography on Museo Nazionale del Fumetto 
 Crepax's Story of O 

1933 births
2003 deaths
Italian comics artists
Italian comics writers
Italian communists
Italian illustrators
Album-cover and concert-poster artists
Artists from Milan
Italian erotic artists
Italian animators
Polytechnic University of Milan alumni